Jones–Wright House, also known as the Polly Wright House, is a historic plantation house located near Rocky Ford, Franklin County, North Carolina.  It was built about 1790, and is a two-story, three bay, single pile Late Georgian style heavy timber frame dwelling.  It has a low gable roof and brick end chimneys.

It was listed on the National Register of Historic Places in 1992.

References

Plantation houses in North Carolina
Houses on the National Register of Historic Places in North Carolina
Georgian architecture in North Carolina
Houses completed in 1790
Houses in Franklin County, North Carolina
National Register of Historic Places in Franklin County, North Carolina